797 Naval Air Squadron (797 NAS) was a Naval Air Squadron of the Royal Navy's Fleet Air Arm.

Notes

References 

700 series Fleet Air Arm squadrons
Military units and formations established in 1942
Air squadrons of the Royal Navy in World War II
Military units and formations disestablished in 1945
1942 establishments in the United Kingdom
1945 disestablishments in the United Kingdom